The 2007–08 Mid-American Conference women's basketball season began with practices in October 2007, followed by the start of the 2007–08 NCAA Division I women's basketball season in November. Conference play began in January 2008 and concluded in March 2008. Bowling Green won the regular season title with a record of 13–3 by one game over Miami. Kate Achter of Bowling Green was named MAC player of the year.

Miami won the MAC tournament over Ohio. Amanda Jackson of Miami was the tournament MVP. Miami lost to Louisville in the first round of the NCAA tournament. Bowling Green played in the WNIT.

Preseason awards
The preseason poll was announced by the league office on October 18, 2007.

Preseason women's basketball poll
(First place votes in parenthesis)

East Division
 Ohio

West Division

Honors

Postseason

Mid–American tournament

NCAA tournament

Women's National Invitational Tournament

Postseason awards

Coach of the Year: Curt Miller, Bowling Green
Player of the Year: Kate Achter, Bowling Green
Freshman of the Year: Lauren Prochaska, Bowling Green
Defensive Player of the Year: Tiera DeLaHoussaye, Western Michigan
Sixth Man of the Year: Emily Maggert, Ball State

Honors

See also
2007–08 Mid-American Conference men's basketball season

References